Aguerd is a small town and rural commune in Essaouira Province of the Marrakech-Tensift-Al Haouz region of Morocco. At the time of the 2004 census, the commune had a total population of 4917 people living in 990 households.

Temperatures range from around 20 °C to 47 °C, however will often halve or more during the night; rain is extremely rare, however occasionally occurs throughout October to February.

References

Populated places in Essaouira Province
Rural communes of Marrakesh-Safi